Lestes rectangularis is a species of damselfly in the family Lestidae, the spreadwings. It is known by the common name slender spreadwing. It is native to eastern North America, including eastern Canada and the United States.

This damselfly is long and thin. The body is black with a pale blue face, and the wings have yellow edges. The female is larger, with paler yellow on the wings. This species lives along springs and drying ponds.

References

R
Odonata of North America
Insects of Canada
Insects of the United States
Fauna of the Eastern United States
Insects described in 1839